Poland hosted and won the Junior Eurovision Song Contest 2019, held in Gliwice. The country's artist and song was selected through Szansa na sukces, organised by the Polish national broadcaster Telewizja Polska (TVP).

Background

Olivia Wieczorek was selected to represent the nation that year with the song "Nie zapomnij". Olivia finished in 11th place out of 17 entries with 60 points. In , Alicja Rega was selected to represent Poland with the song "Mój dom". She finished 8th out of 16 entries with 138 points. Roksana Węgiel won the  contest, and therefore Poland were given the right to host the  contest.

Before Junior Eurovision

Szansa na sukces
Szansa na sukces is a competition organised by TVP that selected the artist and song representing Poland in the contest. It consisted of three pre-recorded semi-finals broadcast on 8, 15 and 22 September 2019, each lasting 65 minutes, and a final held on 29 September 2019. All shows were broadcast on TVP2.

Auditions for the competition were held on 13 and 14 July 2019 at the TVP headquarters in Warsaw. Approximately 1000 people auditioned.

Semi-final 1
The first semi-final was broadcast on 8 September 2019 at 15:15. All seven semi-finalists performed songs from Majka Jeżowska's discography. The following seven artists competed in this semi-final. The contestant in highlighted gold qualified for the season finale, while two other contestants highlighted in blue were the honourable mentions:

Semi-final 2
The second semi-final was broadcast on 15 September 2019 at 15:15. All seven semi-finalists performed covers of songs by Blue Café, who represented Poland at the Eurovision Song Contest 2004 in Istanbul, Turkey. The following seven artists competed in this semi-final. The contestant highlighted in gold qualified for the season finale, while two other contestants highlighted in blue were the honourable mentions:

Semi-final 3
The third semi-final was broadcast on 22 September 2019 at 15:15. All seven semi-finalists performed covers of songs by Papa D. The contestant highlighted in gold qualified for the season finale, while two other contestants highlighted in blue were honourable mentions. The following seven artists competed in this semi-final:

Final
The final was held on 29 September 2019 at 15:15. Three finalists competed, and the winner was determined by a combination of jury voting and televoting. Each finalist performed two songs: one song by an artist which was a guest of the semi-final she qualified from, and one original song to be their candidate entry in hopes of representing Poland at Junior Eurovision on home soil. The show was broadcast in two parts: the first was pre-recorded and featured the competing artists and songs, and the second was broadcast live and revealed the voting results.

Artist and song information

Viki Gabor

Wiktoria "Viki" Gabor (born 24 June 2007) is a Polish child singer. She was a finalist on the second season of The Voice Kids in her country. She represented Poland at the Junior Eurovision Song Contest 2019 with the song "Superhero". She was born in Germany, but spent her childhood in the United Kingdom before moving to Poland later on. She currently lives in Kraków.

Superhero

"Superhero" is a song by Polish singer Wiktoria Gabor. It did represent Poland at the Junior Eurovision Song Contest 2019 and won with 278 points. It is the second time Poland won. Poland is the first country to won twice in a row in the Junior Eurovision Song Contest.

At Junior Eurovision
During the opening ceremony and the running order draw which both took place on 18 November 2019, Poland was drawn to perform eleventh on 24 November 2019, following Kazakhstan and preceding Ireland.

Voting

Detailed voting results

References

Junior Eurovision Song Contest
Poland
Junior